Big Scary is an Australian musical duo formed in Melbourne in 2006, by Tom Iansek and Joanna Syme. The pair have released several EPs and five studio albums. 

Their 2013 album Not Art was nominated for the Australian Album of the Year at the J Awards of 2012, Best Independent Album at the AIR Awards of 2013 and also for ARIA Award for Best Independent Release at the ARIA Music Awards of 2013. Not Art won the 2014 Australian Music Prize, winning the band $30 000.

In 2010 Iansek had formed a side project, #1 Dads. Their 2016 single "The Opposite of Us" was certified gold in Australia in 2020.

History

2006–2010: Formation and early EPs

Big Scary formed in 2006 as a modern folk band with simple shakers and acoustic guitar after the two met through a recommendation of mutual friends. Joanna Syme recalls "Tom was looking to put together a band and needed a drummer. He ended up on my doorstep with a guitar". The duo played casually together in between day jobs until 2008 when Iansek completed a program in audio engineering. Syme said "All of a sudden he was paying a lot more attention to production, and the direction of the band changed."

In late 2008, the band headed into the studio for the first time, recording six live tracks in a single day. In October 2008, they duo uploaded "The Apple Song" onto Triple J Unearthed and officially released in December 2008, alongside a self-titled debut EP.

In March 2009, "This Weight" was released followed in July 2009 with their 4-track EP The Mini EP and single "Hey Somebody" and EP At the Mercy of Elements in January 2010.

In 2010, the duo recorded and released limited-edition EPs named and inspired by each seasonal turn. Upon completing the task in December 2010, the four EPs were compiled into the compilation, The Big Scary Four Seasons. 
Beat Magazine said "Four Seasons proves to be the defining turning point for Big Scary, for they are no longer the next best thing in Australian music, they are the best thing" while the AU Review hailed "the versatility and obscene talent of the players." At the J Awards of 2010, they were nominated for Unearthed Artist of the Year. The song "Autumn", was placed in a high-profile AT&T advert in the USA and released as a single in January 2011.

2011–2020: Vacation, Not Art and Animal

In July 2011, Big Scary released "Mix Tape", the lead single from their debut studio album, Vacation. This was followed by "Gladiator" in September 2011. Vacation was released in October 2011 and peaked at number 37 on the ARIA Charts. Beat Magazine said the album "delves into the theme of slowing losing touch with all those important things we like – friends, lovers, a home and that nifty thing known as employment." Two further singles were released from the album and the band extensively toured USA in 2012.

In February 2013, Big Scary released "Phil Collins", followed by "Luck Now" in April. The duo's second studio album, Not Art was released in June 2013 and peaked at number 32 on the ARIA chart. "Twin Rivers" was released in November 2013. At the ARIA Music Awards of 2013, the album was nominated for two awards. The album won the Australian Music Prize of 2013. The duo signed with Barsuk Records who released Not Art in North America in March 2014.

In September 2015, Big Scary released "Organism", the lead single from their third studio album.

In June 2016, the duo released the six-minute sonic, "Over Matter" and announced the released of their third studio album Animal; a four-part experience drawing inspiration of the daily cycle of the animal kingdom, hunting, lurking, resting and waking. Animal was released on 2 September 2016 and peaked at number 5 on the ARIA charts. The album was supported by their first Australian headline tour in three years. At the ARIA Music Awards of 2017, Iansek was nominated for ARIA Award for Producer of the Year.

2021–present: Daisy and Me and You

In February 2021, Big Scary released "Stay", their first new music in four years and announced the release of their forthcoming fourth studio album Daisy. Singles "Get Out" and "Bursting At the Seams" preceded the album's release on 30 April 2021.

In August 2022, Big Scary released "Real Love" and "Devotion" preceding their fifth studio album, Me and You, which was released on 23 September 2022.

Discography

Studio albums

Compilations

Extended plays

Singles

Awards and nominations

AIR Awards
The Australian Independent Record Awards (commonly known informally as AIR Awards) is an annual awards night to recognise, promote and celebrate the success of Australia's Independent Music sector.

|-
| AIR Awards of 2011
| themselves  
| Breakthrough Independent Artist
| 
|-
| rowspan="4" | AIR Awards of 2013
|themselves
| Best Independent Artist
| 
|-
| Not Art
| Best Independent Album
| 
|-
| "Luck Now"
| Best Independent Single/EP
| 
|-
| themselves
| Carlton Dry Global Music Grant
| 
|-
| rowspan="2" | AIR Awards of 2017
|Animal 
| Best Independent Album
| 
|-
| "The Opposite of Us"
| Best Independent Single/EP
| 
|-
| AIR Awards of 2022
| Daisy
| Best Independent Pop Album or EP
|

Australian Music Prize
The Australian Music Prize (the AMP) is an annual award of $30,000 given to an Australian band or solo artist in recognition of the merit of an album released during the year of award.

|-
| 2013
| Not Art
| Australian Music Prize
| 
|-
| 2016
| Animal
| Australian Music Prize
| 
|-

ARIA Music Awards
The ARIA Music Awards is an annual awards ceremony that recognises excellence, innovation, and achievement across all genres of Australian music. Big Scary have been nominated for three awards.

|-
| rowspan="2"| 2013
| rowspan="2"| Not Art
| Breakthrough Artist - Release
| 
|-
| Best Independent Release
|  
|-
| 2017
| Tom Iansek for Animal by Big Scary
| Producer of the Year
| 
|-
| 2021
| Daisy
| Best Adult Contemporary Album
| 
|-

J Awards
The J Awards are an annual series of Australian music awards that were established by the Australian Broadcasting Corporation's youth-focused radio station Triple J.

|-
| J Awards of 2010
| themselves
| Unearthed Artist of the Year
| 
|-
| J Awards of 2011
| Vacation
| Australian Album of the Year
| 
|-
| J Awards of 2013
| Not Art
| Australian Album of the Year
| 
|-
| J Awards of 2016
| Animal
| Australian Album of the Year
| 
|-

Music Victoria Awards
The Music Victoria Awards, are an annual awards night celebrating Victorian music. They commenced in 2005.

|-
| 2013
| Not Art
| Best Album
| 
|-
| 2020
| Tom Iansek (Big Scary)
| Best Musician
|

References

Victoria (Australia) musical groups
Australian musical duos
Musical groups established in 2006